Esther K. Richardson was a Republican Representative for Hawaii Island in the Hawaii Territorial House of Representatives. In the 1942 election, she was the only woman from Hawaii Island to be elected to public office. The Honolulu Star-Bulletin described her in 1951 as "a slender woman with quiet dignity". She was from South Kona, where she ran a lauhala weaving studio.

References 

20th-century American politicians
20th-century American women politicians
Hawaii Republicans
Members of the Hawaii Territorial Legislature
People from Oahu
Women territorial legislators in Hawaii